= Ranakunde =

- Village
- Country: India
- State: Karnataka
- District: Belgaum
- Talukas: Belgaum

Area
  - Total: 4.9407 km^{2} (1.9076 sq mi)

Population (2011)
  - Total: 1,291
  - Density: 261.3/km^{2} (676.8/sq mi)

Languages
  - Official: Kannada
- Time zone: UTC+5:30 (IST)

Ranakunde is a village in Belgaum district of Karnataka, India. According to Census 2011 Ranakunde has a population of 1,291 people, with 637 being male and 654 being female.
